The Wayne State Warriors men's ice hockey team competed in NCAA's Division I in the College Hockey America (CHA) conference representing Wayne State University. The university dropped their men's program at the end of the 2007–08 season.

Program History
Wayne State University began its men's ice hockey program in 1999, one of several programs to begin at or promote their programs to Division I ice hockey in the late 1990s. Before their first season the Warriors signed Bill Wilkinson as their first coach, hoping that his 20-year track record at Western Michigan would help bring in recruits and build the program quickly.

After a year as an Independent, Wayne State was invited to join College Hockey America, a conference made entirely of newly D-I programs. The Warriors were able to perform very well in the first few years, winning a conference championship, three consecutive conference tournaments and earning a bid to the 2003 NCAA Tournament (the first CHA automatic bid).

The most glaring problem with the ice hockey program at Wayne State was the university's lack of an on-campus ice rink. As a result the team was forced to rent out space in various buildings over its existence. This combined with the Warriors inability to play other regional teams led to waning interest in the program despite being located in the hockey-friendly city of Detroit.

With the program losing money every year and the CCHA not looking to increase its membership beyond 12 teams, Wayne State decided to end its program after the 2007–08 season.

Four years after its dissolution, ice hockey returned to Wayne State as a club sport.

Season-by-season results

Note: GP = Games played, W = Wins, L = Losses, T = Ties

Footnotes

Notable players
Jeff Caister
Adam Krug
Stavros Paskaris
Keith Stanich

See also
Wayne State Warriors women's ice hockey

References

 
College men's ice hockey teams in the United States
Ice hockey teams in Detroit
2008 disestablishments in Michigan
Ice hockey clubs established in 1999
Ice hockey clubs disestablished in 2008
1999 establishments in Michigan